The 5th World Scout Jamboree (Dutch: 5e Wereldjamboree) was the World Scout Jamboree where 81-year-old Robert Baden-Powell gave his farewell.

Organizational details 
The Jamboree in Vogelenzang, Bloemendaal in the Netherlands was opened on July 31, 1937, by Queen Wilhelmina of the Netherlands, with 28,750 Scouts from 54 countries attending. Given 650 water taps and 120 showers, it was considered the cleanest jamboree to date. The main camp was at Vogelenzang, the Sea Scout camp was at Bennebroek, now both part of the  municipality Bloemendaal.  The host site was on the farm of the Vertegaal family.

Symbol 
The symbol used for the world jamboree is the Jacob's staff, which was used during the exploration of new territories in the Age of Discovery by Dutch sailors.  The ten arms symbolize the ten articles of the Scout Law. After this jamboree, the Jacob's staff became the award of gratitude for the Netherlands Scout organizations. Wooden versions were given to Scouts who had supported the jamboree organization. Later on, the silver and gold Jacob's staff became official awards of gratitude in the Dutch national Scouts organization.

Subcamps 
The camp consisted of 12 subcamps, each with its own badge color:

 camp 1: yellow
 camp 2: green
 camp 3: red
 camp 4: light-blue
 camp 5:dark-blue
 camp 6:red/white
 camp 7:blue/white
 camp 8:yellow/green
 camp 9: orange
 camp 10:  green/white (Woestduin)
 camp 11: orange/white (water camp)
 camp 12: white (an insigne without stripe)

Girls and Cub Scouts 
Although girls did not participate in the jamboree (until the 16th World Scout Jamboree in Australia), they were allowed to give a salute to Olave Baden-Powell, their Chief Guide.  Also a special Cub Scout day was organized during the jamboree.

Closure and farewell 
At the closure of the event on August 9, 1937, Baden-Powell pointed out the symbol of this jamboree: the Jacob's Staff and took his farewell.

See also

Notable Scouts/visitors 

 André Lefèvre
 Jan van Hoof 
 Prince Gustaf Adolf, Duke of Västerbotten

Moving pictures 
 Jamboree film (Silent)

References

External links 
 Jamboree Histories at ScoutBase
 Jamboree Histories at Scout.org

1937

July 1937 events
August 1937 events
1937 in the Netherlands